The Vanished (formerly titled Hour of Lead) is a 2020 American psychological thriller film written and directed by Peter Facinelli. The film stars Thomas Jane, Anne Heche, Jason Patric and Facinelli and follows a couple who sets out to find their daughter who disappeared during their camping trip.

Plot
Paul and Wendy Michaelson take their RV to a remote lakeside campsite with their daughter Taylor and pug Lucky.  Paul meets Miranda, an attractive woman in the neighboring campsite, while Wendy is getting supplies. However, when Wendy returns, they discover Taylor has disappeared.

They contact the manager Tom but have no luck. Sheriff Baker and Deputy Rakes organize a search party but tell Paul and Wendy to stay put. After 24 hours, Paul and Wendy file a missing persons report and also learn there is an escaped convict in the area but that he is unlikely to be the suspect. Paul and Wendy decide to conduct their own search and eventually find a man sleeping at a campfire with a gun beside him. Assuming he is the escapee, Wendy grabs his gun. The sleeper awakens and grabs at the gun, only to be shot. The next day, the sheriff tells them the convict was caught on a bus leaving town, and a camper was found shot to death. Paul and Wendy realize Wendy shot an innocent man.

As local authorities are getting more involved, Paul and Wendy grow more suspicious of Miranda and her husband Eric. While the latter are gone Paul and Wendy search their RV but fail to see a strand of beads belonging to their daughter Taylor. That night, Paul observes Miranda making love. The next day the two couples go out on the lake together to continue the search. After six hours on the lake, they spot a plastic bag floating on the water, but it holds no clues. Paul and Wendy accuse Eric and Miranda of taking their daughter because they have been unsuccessful in trying to have a baby. Wendy pulls out a gun, and a fight ensues in which Miranda is shot and Eric is stabbed. Paul and Wendy return to shore, shaken, and argue. When Baker finds Eric’s body, he searches Eric and Miranda’s RV and finds the beads, which Wendy confirms is her daughter's. Baker is informed later that strands of hair were in Eric’s hand.

Later, Wendy suspects Tom might be responsible, so she searches his place, uncovering a hidden passageway leading to a toilet and a closet shelf with a stash of child pornography videos. She is knocked out and bound. After Tom diverts Paul from looking for her, he tries to hold Wendy down, but she finds a hammer on the floor and kills Tom. Baker suspects Tom was part of a child pornography network, and with the case seemingly solved, Paul convinces Wendy to throw away Taylor's stuff to bring closure. The items are later recovered by Tom's groundskeeper Justin, who has been having his own issues. He urgently tries to call police but cannot get through.

Baker eventually receives a Dear John letter from his wife but then notices something strange about a photo of the Michaelsons—they are posed in front of the World Trade Center before the September 11 attacks and Wendy is pregnant in the picture, implying that Taylor would have been much older than 10 years old. After contacting another police network, he learns from Paul's brother that their daughter had died six years before and the Michaelsons have actually been living out a fantasy in which they think their daughter is still alive because they have been unable to successfully go through the stages of grief. Rakes confirms the DNA from the hair in Eric’s hand belonged to Paul.

Flashbacks show the couple murdering Eric and Miranda, Paul planting the beads in the RV and Justin discovering the blanket which has the daughter's real birth date printed on it. The police return to the campsite, but in Wendy and Paul's spot, they find another RV couple who momentarily lose their child and worry she was taken by the Michaelsons, but the child reappears. The Michaelsons have already left the campsite and are reliving their memories with Taylor who is playing on their RV's video screen.

Cast
 Thomas Jane as Paul Michaelson
 Anne Heche as Wendy Michaelson
 Jason Patric as Sheriff Baker
 Peter Facinelli as Deputy Rakes
 Aleksei Archer as Miranda, a woman in her 30s that catches the eye of Paul and Tom
 Kristopher Wente as Eric, Miranda's husband
 Sadie and K.K. Heim as Taylor, Paul and Wendy's 10-year-old daughter
 John D. Hickman as Tom, the campsite manager
 Alex Haydon as Justin, the campsite groundskeeper

Production
Early in development, Laurence Fishburne was being considered to star. Filming occurred in February 2019. The movie was filmed in Tuscaloosa, Alabama.

Release
The film was released in select theaters, VOD and digital platforms on August 21, 2020.

Reception
The film has  rating based on  reviews on review aggregator Rotten Tomatoes. Jeffrey M. Anderson of Common Sense Media awarded the film two stars out five. Glenn Kenny of RogerEbert.com awarded the film three stars.

References

External links
 
 

American psychological thriller films
2020 films
2020 psychological thriller films
Saban Films films
Films about missing people
Films about vacationing
2020s English-language films
2020s American films